Trstená ( or Árvanádasd; ; Middle German: B[r]ingenstadt) is a town in Tvrdošín District, Žilina Region, central Slovakia.

Location
Trstená is surrounded by fields, hills, dense forests and the Tatra Mountains to the East. Nearby are thermal pools. The nearest international airport is Kraków in Poland. The city has rail and road transport.

History
In 1371, King Louis I of Hungary granted Ladislav Piasta of Opole, (Hungarian palatine and landlord of the Orava district), Schwankomir (Piasta's notary and brother in law), Jan Hertel, a relative of Schwankomir from Einseidel in Silesia (and his sons, Jakub and Martin) and Ladislav's brothers (Janko, Grimok, Junislav and Wismer) to establish a new town in the forest (from Zabiedov brook (Zadowa) to the Bukovina valley), near Tvrdošín (Wardossin). This new town was Trstená, a market town. The town's name comes from the word reed (Slovak: trstina).

Jan Hertel
Jan Hertel and his descendants became the hereditary mayors ('advocati' or 'sculteti') of Trstená (initially Bingenstad). Hertel was allowed, even though he was not a nobleman, to  establish a public bar, a slaughter house, a blacksmith's forgery, bakery, shops and toll houses. (Other bakers, publicans, shoemakers and craftsmen were excluded from the town.) He was given the right to build mills anywhere near the Oravica brook, to mine and sell rock and to hunt and fish throughout the locale. Hertel was also made the local magistrate and tax collector. Trstená developed trade with Poland, with goods such as salt, cloth and lead, and also developed a strong potters' guild. Hertel's preferential treatment ensured his control of Trstená.

Taxes
Twenty years after the allocation of land for Trstená, taxes to the rulers of the Hungarian Empire at Orava Castle fell due. On each 11th day of November (St. Martin's day), citizens of Trstená paid one gold coin for each acre of land they owned. Sixteen denarii (silver coins) per acre were due at Easter, Christmas (Nativitatis Domini) and on the 24th day of June (St. John the Baptist's Day). Every sixth floren was given to the mayor himself.

Onus of war
During the reign of Sigismund of Luxemburg, Trstená was ravaged by  Jodocus and Procopius of Luxemburg, Sigismund's cousins.
In 1397, a royal decree was made that land holders were to perform military service. (The old and ill were excluded, but they had to send a substitute). Rich noblemen were to send one archer for every twenty serfs they owned. Even the church had to give half its revenue toward Sigismund's the war against the Ottoman Turks.

Waining of the hereditary mayors
Over time, Trstená and its mayors lost their granted autonomy. By 1424, Trstená was recorded as a domain of the Orava castle. Even so, some conditions of the original grant were respected. For example, in 1480, at the Turiec convent of Premonstratensians in Kláštor pod Znievom, the Trstená mayor, Adalbert Fojt, was favoured. A family called "Trstenský" (perhaps the continuation of the Hertel family renamed for the town), continued in the role of mayor at least until 1609. In that same year, Matthew II granted Trstená township the right to conduct four trade fairs per year.

Lutheran church
A parish of Trstená dates to 1397. An evangelical church developed between 1520 and 1551 (when the presence of an evangelical choir is recorded). In 1556, the Thurzó family ruled from Orava castle and were Lutheran. Although departure from the Catholic church was less evident in Hungary than in Germany, the Hertel family were German and this may have influenced religion in Trstená.

1918
Trstená was located in the Kingdom of Hungary of the Austro-Hungarian Dual Monarchy until the "Martin Declaration" of 1918.

WWII
Trstená was home to a Jewish community until World War II. The Trstená synagogue and Jewish cemetery remain as evidence of their past presence. The latest cemetery headstones are dated in the 1930s. Trstená was occupied by German forces and after heavy shelling, was liberated by Russian forces. A memorial in the main square celebrates the liberation of the town.

Trstená synagogue
The synagogue, located behind the town's main hotel, the Roháč, is now a shoe shop. Its exterior is well maintained in pale blue and white. The entrance portal has Renaissance-Baroque features.

Trstená Jewish cemetery
The wasteland unmarked Jewish cemetery is located on a steep wooded hillside above the main road to Tvrdošín, just outside Trstená township. There is public access through a broken masonry wall with no gate remaining. Within the cemetery is a pre-burial house. Headstones and tombstones of marble and sandstone are present in the dozens, some in Hebrew and some in Roman script.

Demographics
The Trstená population in 2001 was 7461.
98.82% of inhabitants were Slovak, 0.42% Polish and 0.32% Czech. 94.33% of the population were recorded as Roman Catholic, 3.26% with no religious affiliation and 0.78% Lutheran.

Economy
Matsushita Corporation manufactures parts for Panasonic products in Trstená. The OVP-Orava company also manufactures televisions in Trstená. Trade between Poland and Slovakia across the border near Trstená has increased since Slovakia and Poland joined the European Union in 2004.

Landmarks

St Martin's Church

The first written reference to St Martin's church occurred in 1397. The church was rebuilt on its Gothic foundations during the evangelist movement of the 17th to 18th century. The church contains at least two crypts and other burials. Coffins, clothing and textiles found in the crypts represent a cultural record of regional rustic funereal art of the 1700s and 1800s. St Martin's church has a more recent turreted spire, modelled on a Czech design, after the original was dislodged towards the end of World War II by an off course Russian Katuysha rocket. St Martin's church houses a revered religious painting that attracts pilgrims. In floor heating was laid in the church in  1996. The church is surrounded by a wall around which are placed more than six large seats, outdoor confessionals to accommodate the needs of pilgrims.

St George's Church

St Florian's statue
A stone pillar with St Florian's statue was erected in Trstena in 1705.

Festivals
Škapuliar´s fair (July)
St Martin´s Fair (November)

Notable people
Hugolín Gavlovič, priest and author
Martin Hattala, linguist
Erik Jendrišek, footballer
Milo Urban, author
Rudolf Dilong, priest and poet
 Marcel Schein, physicist

Twin towns — sister cities

Trstená is twinned with:

 Hořice, Czech Republic
 Isaszeg, Hungary
 Jabłonka, Poland
 Ozorków, Poland
 Želiezovce, Slovakia
 Žirovnice, Czech Republic

References

External links
 http://www.trstena.sk
 Spectacular Slovakia travelguide - Trstená: the hole has it

Cities and towns in Slovakia